An Arts centre is a community centre specialising in the arts.

Arts Centre may also refer to:

Organisations
 The Arts Centre (Melbourne), in Victoria, Australia
 Christchurch Arts Centre, in Christchurch, New Zealand

Stations
 Arts Center Station (disambiguation), train stations of the name